Laurence O'Loughlin (21 February 1854 – 25 January 1927) was an Australian politician who represented the South Australian House of Assembly seats of Frome from 1890 to 1902 and Burra Burra from 1902 to 1918. He represented the Liberal Union from 1910 to 1918, when he defected to the Farmers and Settlers Association. He served as Speaker of the South Australian House of Assembly from 1912 to 1915.

See also
Laurence, South Australia

References

 

Members of the South Australian House of Assembly
Speakers of the South Australian House of Assembly
1854 births
1927 deaths